Mitko Milushev (born 8 June 1914, date of death unknown) was a Bulgarian equestrian. He competed in two events at the 1960 Summer Olympics.

References

1914 births
Year of death missing
Bulgarian male equestrians
Olympic equestrians of Bulgaria
Equestrians at the 1960 Summer Olympics
Sportspeople from Pernik Province
20th-century Bulgarian people